Haplogroup LT or LT-L298/P326, also known as K1 (and until 2008 as Haplogroup K2), is a Y-chromosome DNA haplogroup. Its defining SNP mutations are L298 and P326.

No confirmed cases of the basal paragroup LT* have been identified among living males or human remains.

Structure

It is generally believed that LT (L298/P326) originated somewhere in Asia.

LT is a direct descendant of haplogroup K (M9).

The direct descendants of LT are haplogroup L (M20), also known as K1a, and haplogroup T (M184), also known as K1b.

Distribution

Y-DNA haplogroup LT is an old lineage widely distributed at low concentrations. It was established approximately 30,000-40,000 years ago, probably in South Asia or West Asia.

Its descendants are found mainly in populations indigenous to the Horn of Africa, North Africa, South Asia, West Asia, Central Asia and Europe. 

L-M20 is found at its highest frequency in India, Pakistan and among the Balochs of Afghanistan, and at low frequencies in the Middle East and Europe.

T-M184 is most common in the Horn of Africa, the Nile Valley, the Arabian peninsula, Iran, as well as in some regions of Eastern India and Europe.

References 

LT